This is a list of current and former companies based in the San Francisco Bay Area, broken down by type of business.

Fortune 500 rankings are indicated in parentheses. As of 2020, 38 Fortune 500 companies had headquarters in the San Francisco Bay Area.

San Francisco-based businesses are not listed here; the subset of San Francisco-based businesses by type is at the list of companies based in San Francisco. This list includes extant businesses formerly located in the Bay Area, which have moved, or been bought out by other companies and had their headquarters relocated. With the booming tech industry in San Francisco, businesses face a lot of pressure to keep up with the surge of new companies.

Companies currently based in the San Francisco Bay Area

Aerospace/defense
Hexcel Corporation – Dublin
L3 Technologies – Menlo Park, (Randtron) San Leandro (Applied Technologies), Santa Rosa (Sonoma EO)
Lawrence Livermore National Laboratory – Livermore
Lockheed Martin Space Systems – Palo Alto, Sunnyvale
Made In Space, Inc. – Mountain View
NASA Ames Research Center – Moffett Field
Sandia National Laboratories – Livermore
Space Systems Loral – Palo Alto

Apparel
Allbirds- San Francisco
Bebe – Brisbane
Betabrand - San Francisco
Dolls Kill – San Francisco
Everlane – San Francisco
Gap Inc. (199) – San Francisco
Jos. A. Bank - Fremont
Levi Strauss & Co. (495) – San Francisco
Marmot – Rohnert Park
ModCloth – San Francisco
Mountain Hardwear – Richmond
O'Neill – Santa Cruz
Ross Stores (202) – Dublin
Stitch Fix – San Francisco
Poshmark – Redwood City
Zazzle – Redwood City
Tea Collection - San Francisco

Automotive
Cruise - San Francisco
Motiv Power Systems – Hayward
Lucid Motors – Newark
Nio – San Jose
Rivian – Palo Alto
Uber - San Francisco
Waymo – Mountain View
Zoox – San Carlos
Byton – Santa Clara

Biotechnology
23andMe – Mountain View
Anthera Pharmaceuticals – Hayward
BioMarin Pharmaceutical – San Rafael
Bio-Rad Laboratories – Hercules
Buck Institute for Age Research – Novato
Calico – South San Francisco
Chiron – Emeryville
Genentech – South San Francisco
Gilead Sciences (140) – Foster City
Intuitive Surgical – Sunnyvale
Nektar Therapeutics – San Francisco
Mendel Biotechnology, Inc. – Hayward
Roche Molecular Systems - Belmont
Signature BioScience - San Francisco
Verily Life Sciences – Mountain View

Consumer goods
Benefit Cosmetics – San Francisco
Bianchi USA – Hayward
CamelBak – Petaluma
Clorox (474) – Oakland
GoPro – San Mateo
Kleenspeed Technologies – Mountain View
Method – San Francisco
Sephora – San Francisco
Specialized Bicycle Components – Morgan Hill

Creative/design
Ammunition – San Francisco
IDEO – San Francisco
Landor Associates – San Francisco
Traction (agency) - San Francisco
fuseproject – San Francisco

Education
Chegg – Santa Clara
Course Hero – Redwood City
Coursera – Mountain View
Khan Academy – Mountain View
Magoosh – Berkeley
Quizlet- San Francisco
Remind – San Francisco
Udacity - Mountain View

Electronics
Adaptec – Milpitas
Advanced Micro Devices (AMD) (448) – Sunnyvale
Agilent Technologies (547) – Santa Clara
Altera (Intel) – San Jose
Antec – Fremont
Apple Inc. (4) – Cupertino
Applied Materials (218) – Santa Clara
Asus – Fremont
Broadcom Inc. (138) – San Jose
Barracuda Networks – Campbell
Brocade Communications Systems – Santa Clara
Cisco Systems (64) – San Jose
Digidesign – Daly City
Dust Networks – Hayward
E-mu Systems – Scotts Valley
Fairchild Semiconductor – San Jose
Fitbit – San Francisco
Fujitsu Computer Products of America – Sunnyvale
Genesis Microchip – Santa Clara
Hewlett Packard (58) – Palo Alto
Hewlett Packard Enterprise (109) – San Jose
Hitachi Data Systems – Santa Clara
Hitachi Global Storage Technologies – San Jose
Integrated Device Technology – San Jose
Intel (45) – Santa Clara
Jawbone – San Francisco
JDS Uniphase – Milpitas
Juniper Networks – Sunnyvale
Keysight - Santa Rosa
KLA Tencor – Milpitas
Lam Research (331) – Fremont
Logitech – Newark
Maxim Integrated - San Jose
Marvell – Santa Clara
Monster Cable Products – Brisbane
Nest Labs – Palo Alto
NetApp (478) – Sunnyvale
Nvidia (292) – Santa Clara
Plantronics (Now Poly) – Santa Cruz
Philips Lumileds Lighting Company – San Jose
Rambus – Los Altos
Sanmina-SCI (385) – San Jose
Seagate Technology (174) – Cupertino
Silicon Graphics – Fremont (acquired by Rackable Systems)
Silicon Image – Sunnyvale
Solectron Corporation – Milpitas
Sony Optiarc America Inc. – San Jose
Supermicro – San Jose
Synnex (130) – Fremont
Synopsys - Mountain View
Terayon – Santa Clara
THX – San Rafael
Touchstone Semiconductor – Milpitas
Western Digital (198) – San Jose
Xilinx – San Jose

Energy
Bloom Energy  – Sunnyvale
Chevron (15) – San Ramon
Cupertino Electric – San Jose
Energy Recovery Inc. – San Leandro
Mosaic Inc. – Oakland (solar power crowdfunding)
PG&E (189) – Oakland
Rosendin Electric – San Jose
SolarCity – San Mateo
SunEdison – Belmont
Sungevity – Oakland
SunPower – San Jose
Sunrun – San Francisco

Engineering and Construction
DPR Construction- Redwood City
Granite Construction – Watsonville
Katerra – Menlo Park 
Swinerton – San Francisco
Webcor Builders – San Francisco

Entertainment
Capcom U.S.A. – San Francisco
Crunchyroll – San Francisco
Dolby Laboratories – San Francisco
Electronic Arts – Redwood City
Industrial Light & Magic – San Francisco
Kerner Optical – San Rafael
Lucasfilm Animation – San Rafael (Lucas Valley)
Netflix (164) – Los Gatos
Niantic – San Francisco
Pandora Radio – Oakland
Philo – San Francisco
Pixar – Emeryville
Roblox Corporation – San Mateo
Sega of America –  San Francisco
Skywalker Sound – San Rafael (Lucas Valley)
Sony Interactive Entertainment (PlayStation) – San Mateo
Ubisoft –  San Francisco
Zynga – San Francisco

Financial
Bill.com – San Jose
Block, Inc. – San Francisco
Brex - San Francisco
Robinhood - Menlo Park
Calypso Technology - San Francisco
Coinbase – San Francisco
FICO (Fair Isaac Corporation) - San Jose and San Rafael
Fireman's Fund Insurance Company – Novato (now Allianz Global Corporate & Specialty)
First Republic Bank - San Francisco
Fisher Investments – Woodside
Franklin Templeton Investments (493) – San Mateo
Lending Club - San Francisco
Patelco Credit Union - Dublin
PayPal (182) – San Jose
Robert Half International (482) – Menlo Park
SigFig - San Francisco
Silicon Valley Bank – Santa Clara
SoFi - San Francisco
TPG Sixth Street Partners — San Francisco
Visa, Inc. (137) – San Francisco
Wells Fargo Bank (30) – San Francisco
Yodlee – Redwood City

Food and drink
Food and drink establishments with one location are not included in this list. Local and regional establishments with more than one location are included.

21st Amendment Brewery – San Leandro
Anchor Brewers & Distillers, LLC – San Francisco
Annabelle Candy Company – Hayward
Annie's Homegrown – Berkeley
Black Angus Steakhouse – Los Altos
Blue Bottle Coffee – Oakland – subsidiary of Nestle
C&H Pure Cane Sugar – Crockett
Clif Bar – Emeryville
Columbus Salame – Hayward
Dreyer's Grand Ice Cream – Oakland
Extreme Pizza - San Francisco
Ghirardelli Chocolate Company – San Leandro
Häagen-Dazs – Oakland
Impossible Foods - Redwood City
Il Fornaio – Corte Madera
Jelly Belly – Fairfield
Martinelli's – Watsonville
Mountain Mike's Pizza – Hayward
Odwalla – Half Moon Bay
Otis Spunkmeyer – San Leandro
Peet's Coffee & Tea – Emeryville
Point Reyes Farmstead Cheese Company – Point Reyes Station
PowerBar – Berkeley
See's Candies – South San Francisco
Shasta – Hayward
Takaki Bakery (Andersen Institute of Bread and Life) – Hayward
Togo's – San Jose
Verve Coffee Roasters – Santa Cruz

Healthcare
Castlight Health – San Francisco
Eargo – Mountain Valley 
Kaiser Permanente – Oakland
One Medical - San Francisco
Palo Alto Medical Foundation – Palo Alto

Internet
Airbnb – San Francisco
Alphabet Inc.(11) – Mountain View
Ask.com – Oakland
Box – Redwood City
Cisco (64) – San Jose
Craigslist – San Francisco
DoorDash - San Francisco
Dropbox - San Francisco
Ebates – San Francisco
eBay (295) – San Jose
Evernote - Redwood City
Meta (46) – Menlo Park
Glassdoor - Mill Valley
Google – Mountain View - subsidiary of Alphabet Inc.
Instacart – San Francisco
LinkedIn – Sunnyvale
Lyft – San Francisco
Pinterest – San Francisco
Poshmark - Redwood City
Quora – Mountain View
Salesforce.com (190) – San Francisco
Slack Technologies – San Francisco
Poll Everywhere - San Francisco
Postmates - San Francisco
Rubrik - Palo Alto
SurveyMonkey – San Mateo
Tripping.com – San Francisco
Twitch – San Francisco
Twitter – San Francisco
Uber (228) – San Francisco
Wikimedia Foundation – San Francisco
Workday – Pleasanton
Yelp – San Francisco
Yummly – Palo Alto - subsidiary of Whirlpool Corporation
YouTube – San Bruno - subsidiary of Alphabet Inc.
Zendesk - San Francisco
Zoosk – San Francisco
Zoom Video Communications - San Jose

Media
Communication Arts – Menlo Park
Daily Review – Hayward
Dwell – San Francisco
Future US – South San Francisco
POPSUGAR Inc. – San Francisco
San Francisco Chronicle – San Francisco
San Jose Mercury News – San Jose
University of California Press – Berkeley
Complex (magazine) – San Francisco

Mobile media
Bleacher Report – San Francisco
MobiTV – Emeryville
TubeMogul – Emeryville

Musical instruments and accessories
Dunlop Manufacturing – Benicia
E-mu Systems – Scotts Valley
Saga Musical Instruments – South San Francisco
Santa Cruz Guitar Company – Santa Cruz
Universal Audio (company) – Scotts Valley

Networking
A10 Networks – San Jose
Arista Networks – Santa Clara
Aryaka Networks – Milpitas
Barefoot Networks (Intel) – Palo Alto
Brocade Communications (Broadcom) – San Jose
Cisco (64) – San Jose
Ericsson – Santa Clara
Extreme Networks – San Jose
F5 Networks – San Jose
Fortinet – Sunnyvale
Juniper Networks – Sunnyvale
Minerva Networks – San Jose
NETGEAR – San Jose
Palo Alto Networks – Santa Clara
ZPE Systems – Fremont

Real estate
Digital Realty – San Francisco
Jay Paul Company – San Francisco
LiquidSpace – San Francisco
Prologis – San Francisco
Trulia – San Francisco

Retail
BevMo! – Concord
California Closets - Richmond
Cost Plus Inc. – Alameda

Gap.com – San Francisco
Gymboree – San Francisco
Jos. A. Bank - Fremont
Levi's – San Francisco
Macys.com – San Francisco
Minted – San Francisco
Pottery Barn – San Francisco
Restoration Hardware – Corte Madera
Ross Stores (412) - Dublin
Safeway – Pleasanton – subsidiary of [Albertsons]
Sephora - San Francisco
Shutterfly – Redwood City
Timbuk2  – San Francisco
Walmart.com – San Bruno
West Marine – Watsonville
Williams-Sonoma, Inc. (489) – San Francisco
Zazzle – Redwood City

Software
Adobe Inc. (285) – San Jose
AppDynamics – San Francisco
Autodesk – San Rafael
Bloombase - Redwood City
Business Objects – San Jose
Box - Redwood City
Cloudera - Palo Alto
DocuSign - San Francisco
Dropbox - San Francisco
Genesys – Daly City
GitHub - San Francisco
Intuit(445)– Mountain View
Imperva – San Mateo
Malwarebytes – Santa Clara
McAfee – Santa Clara
Medallia – Palo Alto
Mozilla – Mountain View
Neo4j – San Mateo
New Relic – San Francisco
 North Beach Games - San Rafael
Nutanix – San Jose
Objectivity, Inc. – San Jose 
Palantir Technologies – Palo Alto
People Power Company – Palo Alto
Piggybackr – San Francisco
Pivotal Software (VMware) – San Francisco
Pyze – Redwood City
Qualys - Foster City
Sage Intacct – San Jose
SAP – Palo Alto
ServiceNow - Santa Clara
Splunk – San Francisco
Sybase (SAP) – Dublin
Symantec (461) – Mountain View
TeleNav – Santa Clara
Trimble - Sunnyvale
TIBCO Software – Palo Alto
VMware – Palo Alto

Sports
24 Hour Fitness – San Ramon
All Pro Wrestling – Hayward
Bay Area Panthers – San Jose
Fox Racing Shox – Scotts Valley
Giro – Santa Cruz
Golden State Warriors – San Francisco
GoPro – San Mateo
JumpSport – San Jose
Kestrel USA – Santa Cruz
Oakland A's – Oakland
Pac-12 Conference – Walnut Creek
San Francisco 49ers – Santa Clara
San Francisco Giants – San Francisco
San Jose Earthquakes - San Jose
San Jose Sharks – San Jose
San Jose Barracuda – San Jose
Santa Cruz Bicycles – Santa Cruz
Santa Cruz Skateboards – Santa Cruz
Santa Cruz Warriors – Santa Cruz
Specialized Bicycle Components – Morgan Hill
TRX System – San Francisco

Telecommunications
Avaya – Santa Clara
Pacific Telemanagement Services – San Leandro

Transportation and logistics
Gillig Corporation – Livermore
Lime - San Francisco 
Lyft - San Francisco 
Uber - San Francisco

Companies formerly based in the San Francisco Bay Area
This list contains both extant companies which have moved their headquarters out of the Bay Area (often during a corporate buyout), and defunct companies.
Bare Escentuals – purchased by Shiseido, now headquarters in Rutherford, New Jersey
Bank of America (9) – relocated to Charlotte, North Carolina
Bechtel - relocated to Reston, Virginia
Best Manufacturing Company – San Leandro (defunct)
Calpine Corporation (318) – relocated to Houston, Texas
Caterpillar Inc. (50) – relocated to Peoria, Illinois
Chaosium – formerly based in Oakland, then Hayward, now based in Ann Arbor, Michigan
Charles Schwab Corporation (271) – San Francisco - moved to Westlake, TX 
Charlotte Russe (clothing retailer) - acquired by YM Inc.
ComputerLand – Hayward (defunct)
Esprit – relocated to Ratingen, Germany and Hong Kong, China
Etec Systems, Inc. – Hayward (defunct)
Excite@Home – purchased by Ask.com
Flickr – acquired by Yahoo!
FMC Corporation (Farm Machinery Corp, Farm Machinery and Chemical Corp) – moved headquarters from San Jose to Chicago; subsequently moved to Philadelphia
Folgers Coffee – acquired by The J.M. Smucker Co.
Friden, Inc. – San Leandro (defunct)
Hambrecht & Quist, LLC – purchased by Chase Manhattan Bank, later folded into JP Morgan Securities following Chase's purchase of JPM
Hearst Corporation – relocated to New York City
Hills Brothers Coffee – purchased by Massimo Zanetti Beverage USA
Hunt Brothers Cannery – moved from Hayward
JanSport – Alameda acquired by VF Corporation
Jamba Juice - moved from Emeryville to Frisco, Texas
Knight-Ridder – purchased by The McClatchy Company
Leslie Salt – purchased by Cargill in 1978
Maxtor – Milpitas – acquired by Seagate
Mervyn's – Hayward (defunct)
McKesson Corporation – moved from San Francisco to Irving, Texas
Montgomery Securities – purchased by NationsBank Corporation on June 30, 1997
National Semiconductor – Santa Clara - acquired by Texas Instruments
NUMMI – automobile manufacturer (defunct)
Oracle (82) – moved headquarters from Redwood City to Austin, Texas
Pacific Telesis – acquired by SBC Communications, which became AT&T when it purchased AT&T Corporation
Pegasus Aviation Finance Company – acquired by AWAS
Peterbilt Motors – relocated to Denton, Texas
Pier 1 - started in San Mateo, now headquartered in Fort Worth, Texas
Qume – Hayward (defunct)
Robertson Stephens – closed by its parent company FleetBoston in July 2002
Rolling Stone – relocated to New York City, New York
SanDisk – Milpitas – acquired by Western Digital
Scharffen Berger Chocolate Maker – acquired by The Hershey Company
The Sharper Image 
Six Apart – moved to Tokyo
Southern Pacific – acquired by Union Pacific Railroad
Swensen's Ice Cream – acquired by International Franchise Corp (IFC) of Markham, Ontario, Canada
Tesla (124) – moved to Austin, TX
Transamerica – purchased by Aegon
United Commercial Bank – acquired by East West Bank
URS Corporation - San Francisco - acquired by AECOM
Victoria's Secret - started in Palo Alto, now headquartered in Reynoldsburg, Ohio
Virgin America – Burlingame - acquired by Alaska Airlines
Yahoo! (353) – Sunnyvale- acquired by Verizon Media

See also

List of California companies
List of companies based in Berkeley, California (subset, mostly included in this list)
List of companies based in Hayward, California (subset, mostly included in this list)
List of companies based in Oakland, California (subset, mostly included in this list)

References

 
San Francisco Bay Area
Companies